Crackers is a 2011 Indian Hindi-language stereoscopic 3D animation film directed by Anil Goyal, and written by Priyank Dubey. It is produced under the 'RTM Technologies Pvt Ltd' banner. The film was released direct-to-video on 20 May 2011.

Plot
The Story of Crackers is about today's youth and how they can fight evil in life. The director has tried to create a role model from the zealous youngsters of today, that can and should stand up to evil.

The first half of the movie is full of fun, comedy and romance on a college campus, where a youth festival is in full swing. The second half deals with a terror attack on the campus and how the youth channelizes their energy to counter and foil the attack. The movie revolves around four characters - Roxy, (Anil Goyal), Gopu (Nikhil Dwivedi) and Kate (Smilie Suri) along with some comic character from the film industry (Siraj Khan) to create the fun in the movie.

References

External links
 Crackers at Bollywood Hungama

2010s Hindi-language films
2011 3D films
3D animated films
2011 films
Indian direct-to-video films
2011 direct-to-video films
Films based on the 2008 Mumbai attacks